The Noorda College of Osteopathic Medicine is a private, for-profit medical school for osteopathic medicine located in the city of  Provo in the U.S. state of Utah. It is the third medical school in the state, and the second school of osteopathic medicine.

History
The college was founded in 2019. In July 2020, the college received accreditation approval to begin recruiting students. The school was named "Noorda College of Osteopathic Medicine" to recognized the Ray and Tye Noorda Foundation, which provided $50 million in funding to found the school.

Academics
Noorda-COM offers the Doctor of Osteopathic Medicine (DO), as well as a dual DO/MBA program in conjunction with Utah Valley University. Like many other medical schools in the United States, Noorda-COM students will take basic science courses in the first two years of medical school, and move on to clinical clerkships during their third and fourth years. The school plans to enroll 90 students (50% capacity) during its first year, 135 (75% capacity) during its second year, 180 (100% capacity) during its third year, and 194 students each year thereafter (the additional students past 180 are allowed to account for attrition).

Campus
The college is located on a 21-acre campus, acquired from a neighboring golf course. Groundbreaking for the campus began in 2019. Campus plans include a 685,000 square feet building with 685 units of multi-family housing, and 234,000 square feet of parking structures. Cost of construction is projected $65 million.

See also
 List of medical schools in the United States

References

Educational institutions established in 2010
Osteopathic medical schools in the United States
Private universities and colleges in Utah
2010 establishments in Utah